Grant Easterbrook is an entrepreneur. He has been cited on the topic of fintech in the media over 150 times, including in
The Wall Street Journal, 
Reuters,

The New York Times,
Forbes, Investment News,
Financial Times,
San Francisco Chronicle, ThinkAdvisor
VentureBeat,
Fortune,
Financial Planning,

MarketWatch,
Financial Advisor,
Crain's New York Business,
Huffington Post,
MSN Money,
PBS,
Al Jazeera America,
Main Street,
U.S. News & World Report,
Wealth Management
and The Fiscal Times.

In 2015 Easterbrook left his role as a fintech analyst to found Dream Forward, a Newark-based tech startup building an artificial intelligence for the retirement and 401(k) industry.

Early life and education
Easterbrook is the son of author Gregg Easterbrook and the nephew of Judge Frank Easterbrook.

Easterbrook graduated from Winston Churchill High School in Potomac, Maryland in 2007. He graduated from Bowdoin College in Brunswick, Maine in 2011, where he was a member of the Bowdoin College football team.

References

American financial analysts
Living people
Bowdoin College alumni
People from Bethesda, Maryland
Date of birth missing (living people)
Year of birth missing (living people)